The Gold Coast Hinterland Great Walk is a  walking track in the Gold Coast region of Queensland, Australia.  The path takes the walker through the most extensive area of subtropical rainforest in the world.

References

External links 

Queensland Department of Environment and Science
Topographic maps of Great Walks in Queensland

Geography of Gold Coast, Queensland
Walking in Australia
Tourist attractions on the Gold Coast, Queensland

Hiking and bushwalking tracks in Queensland